Xie Jing may refer to:

Xie Jing (badminton) (born 1990), a badminton player in the 2010 China Badminton Super League
Xie Jing (Shufa) (3rd century), a politician from the Three Kingdoms, China
Xie Jing (3rd century), a general from the Three Kingdoms, China